Tolman Creek is a stream in the U.S. state of Oregon. It is a tributary to Neil Creek.

Tolman Creek was named in 1852 after James C. Tolman.

References

Rivers of Oregon
Rivers of Jackson County, Oregon